This is a list of New Zealand television events and premieres which occurred, or are scheduled to occur, in 2013, the 53rd year of continuous operation of television in New Zealand.

Events 
21 April - Launch of the New Zealand version of The X Factor.
22 July - Jackie Thomas wins the first series of The X Factor.
20 December – After negotiations fell through with United States distribution company, 20th Century Fox, MediaWorks New Zealand announces a new but somewhat limited deal, has been reached between MediaWorks and 20th Century Fox.  However, due to the length of time the negotiation took, other television networks (both free to air and subscription) obtained the rights to some of the primetime shows from TV3 and Four.
8 December - 22-year-old singer Renee Maurice wins the third series of New Zealand's Got Talent.

Premieres

Domestic series

International series

Telemovies and miniseries

Documentaries

Specials

Programming changes

Programmes changing networks 
Criterion for inclusion in the following list is that New Zealand premiere episodes will air in New Zealand for the first time on the new network. This includes when a program is moved from a free-to-air network's primary channel to a digital multi-channel, as well as when a program moves between subscription television channels – provided the preceding criterion is met. Ended television series which change networks for repeat broadcasts are not included in the list.

Free-to-air premieres
This is a list of programmes which made their premiere on New Zealand free-to-air television that had previously premiered on New Zealand subscription television. Programs may still air on the original subscription television network.

Subscription premieres
This is a list of programmes which made their premiere on New Zealand subscription television that had previously premiered on New Zealand free-to-air television. Programmes may still air on the original free-to-air television network.

Programmes returning in 2013

Milestone episodes in 2013

Programmes ending in 2013

Deaths

References